EXIT! (or alternatively: Exit!) is a German journal of social criticism, and discussion group formed in 2004, which has a value-critical(Wertkritik) approach, both to the contemporary produktionsweise, and the explanatory attempts of traditional Weltanschauungsmarxismus, and its critique of political economy. EXIT! thereby subjects "abstract labour" and its expressions of value, commodity, money and market to a fundamental critique. The Wertabspaltungskritik of the philosopher Roswitha Scholz occupies a large space in the journal.

History 
The group Exit! emerged from a split in the Krisis group, with its most active and prominent author, the philosopher Robert Kurz co-founding the new group Exit! According to those who would become involved in Exit! , the split was the result of a putsch by a minority of the editorial staff of Krisis.

Some of the authors featured in the journal include Robert Kurz, Roswitha Scholz, Claus Peter Ortlieb, Tomasz Konicz, Anselm Jappe etc. The journal originated in the German speaking world, but have now spread to the romance-speaking world and other countries as China, Japan etc.

See also 

 Commodity fetishism
 Critique of political economy
 Moishe Postone
 Robert Kurz
 The tendency of the rate of profit to fall
 Wertkritik

Sources

External links 
 EXIT! - Official website (Articles in english), (More articles in english)

German-language magazines
Magazines established in 2004
German philosophy